The Yangon Times is a weekly newspaper published in Burma. The website obtains much of its information from Flower News .

See also
List of newspapers in Burma

References

Weekly newspapers published in Myanmar